A grownup is an adult.

Grownup may also refer to:
 Grown-Ups, a 1980 British BBC television film 
 Grown Ups (1997 TV series), a British sitcom
 Grown Ups (1999 TV series), an American sitcom
 Grownups (2006 TV series), a British sitcom
 Grown Up (film), a 1993 short animated film by Joanna Priestley
 Grown Ups (film), a 2010 American comedy film
 Grown Ups 2, the sequel film
Grown Ups (band), a pop punk band from Chicago
 Grown Up (album), a 2010 album by By2
 Grown-Up (EP), a 2012 EP by F.T. Island
 "Grown Up", a 2012 single by Danny Brown
 "Grown Up", a 2016 single by Monni
 "The Grown-Ups" (Mad Men) a 2009 episode of the television show